Prince Shembo (born December 24, 1991) is a former American football linebacker. He was drafted by the Atlanta Falcons in the fourth round of the 2014 NFL Draft. He played college football at Notre Dame.

High school career
Prince attended Ardrey Kell High School in Charlotte, North Carolina. He played in only five games during the senior campaign. He suffered a high ankle sprain in the preseason and then was suspended from school on September 16, 2009 for an aggressive incident directed at a teacher. He recorded 86 tackles with nine sacks and added two interceptions, two forced fumbles and two fumble recoveries as a junior in 2008, and made 117 tackles during sophomore season in 2007 and was named to 2007 all-Observer team by Charlotte Observer.

Considered a four-star recruit by Rivals.com, he was rated as the 7th best inside linebacker in the nation. He accepted a scholarship offer from Notre Dame over offers from Miami, Duke, and North Carolina.

College career
As a true freshman, he saw action in all 13 games in 2010. He was one of six freshmen to make their Irish debut against Purdue, and one of three freshmen to play in every game. He registered 15 tackles on the year, including six solo stops and nine assisted tackles, and had five tackles for loss and four and a half sacks. In 2011, he appeared in 12 games for the Irish, while starting eight contests. He totaled 31 tackles, including three and a half for loss, and also had a pair of sacks. In his junior season in 2012, Shembo set career highs in tackles (51), tackles for loss (10.5), sacks (7.5) and quarterback hurries (12), and earned first-team all-independent honours. As a senior, he started all 13 games, totaling 46 tackles, including 5.5 for loss, 5.5 sacks and 17 quarterback hurries.

Professional career
Shembo was drafted by the Atlanta Falcons in the fourth round (139th overall) of the 2014 NFL Draft. He signed with the Falcons on May 18, 2014.

The Falcons waived Shembo on May 29, 2015, after he was arrested for aggravated cruelty to animals after allegedly killing his girlfriend's dog. Shembo's attorney says Shembo accidentally killed the Yorkshire terrier his girlfriend owned when he kicked it after it had bitten him.

Personal life
His father, Maurice Shembo, immigrated to the United States from the Democratic Republic of the Congo in 1986. His sister, Christelle Shembo, is a forward for the Wake Forest University women's basketball team.

Controversies

High school suspension

In 2009, his senior year of high school, Shembo was suspended for throwing a desk at a teacher who had taken away his cell phone.

Sexual battery accusation and suicide of Lizzy Seeberg 

During the 2014 NFL Scouting Combine, Shembo admitted that as a Notre Dame student in 2010 he was accused of inappropriately touching Lizzy Seeberg, who accused him of  sexually assault.  Lizzy Seeberg, a female student at nearby Saint Mary's College, later died by suicide. Shembo said that he is innocent of the accusation. Seeberg's father responded by claiming that Notre Dame was negligent in investigating Seeberg's accusation for fear of outing Shembo.

Death of girlfriend's dog 

On May 29, 2015, Shembo was arrested by Gwinnett Police after being accused of killing his girlfriend's dog.

References

External links
 Notre Dame Fighting Irish bio

1991 births
Living people
American people of Democratic Republic of the Congo descent
Notre Dame Fighting Irish football players
Players of American football from Charlotte, North Carolina
Atlanta Falcons players
American football linebackers
Campus sexual assault